Goodboys are an English house music group consisting of Joshua Grimmett and Ethan Shore. Their breakthrough song "Piece of Your Heart", which was a collaboration with Italian production trio Meduza in 2019, reached number 2 on the UK Singles Chart and received a 2019 Grammy nomination for "Best Dance Recording". Their next single, "Lose Control", also with Meduza and with vocals from English singer Becky Hill was also a hit internationally.

Discography

Singles

As lead artist

As featured artist

Remixes

 2021: Joel Corry and Jax Jones featuring Charli XCX and Saweetie - OUT OUT

Songwriting credits

References

English house music groups
Musical groups from London
Musical groups established in 2019
British musical trios
Record production trios
Polydor Records artists
Virgin Records artists
2019 establishments in England